Shift work is an employment practice designed to make use of the 24 hours of the clock, rather than a standard 8 hour working day.

Shift work may also refer to:
 Shift-Work (album), an album by The Fall
 "Shiftwork" (song), a song by Kenny Chesney and George Strait
 Shift Work (band), a London-based electronic duo
 Shift Work (1986 film), a British television film by Lesley Bruce in the anthology series ScreenPlay

See also
 Shift work sleep disorder, a circadian rhythm sleep disorder
 Graveyard shift (disambiguation)
 Night Shift (disambiguation)